Karo is a 1937 adventure-war film directed by Artashes Hay-Artyan and S. Taits and starring Avet Avetisyan, Moko Hakobyan and Ori Buniatyan

Cast 
Moko Hakobyan - Karo
Gurgen Gabrielyan - Tatul
Murad Kostanyan - Hambo
Amasi Martirosyan - gypsy boy
Gurgen Janibekyan - Amiryan
Avet Avetisyan - Colonel
Ori Buniatyan - Tchibukh
V. Badalyan - Davit
D. Tzaturyan - Ashkhen
Samvel Mkrtchyan - Officer #1
Aram Samvelyan - Officer #2
G. Ohanyan - Cadet

References

External links
 

1937 films
1930s war adventure films
Armenian black-and-white films
Soviet black-and-white films
Films set in Armenia
Soviet war adventure films
Soviet-era Armenian films
Armenfilm films
Armenian adventure films